Branko Elsner (23 November 1929 – 17 November 2012) was a Slovenian football manager and player, most known for being the manager of the Austria national team twice.

Elsner had his first success as a football coach in his Slovenian homeland with Olimpija, whom he trained from 1964 to 1967.

Personal life
His son Marko Elsner, and grandsons Luka Elsner and Rok Elsner, were all professional footballers.

References

External links

1929 births
2012 deaths
Footballers from Ljubljana
Yugoslav footballers
NK Olimpija Ljubljana (1945–2005) players
Yugoslav football managers
Yugoslav expatriate football managers
Slovenian football managers
Slovenian expatriate football managers
NK Olimpija Ljubljana (1945–2005) managers
FC Wacker Innsbruck managers
Austria national football team managers
Vegalta Sendai managers
Expatriate football managers in Austria
Expatriate football managers in Japan
Yugoslav expatriate sportspeople in Austria
Slovenian expatriate sportspeople in Japan
Elsner family
Association footballers not categorized by position